Bruno Tiago may refer to:

 Bruno Tiago (footballer, born 1981), Portuguese football midfielder
 Bruno Tiago (footballer, born 1989), Brazilian football attacking midfielder